The Great White Man-Eating Shark: A Cautionary Tale is a 1989 picture book by Margaret Mahy and illustrated by Jonathan Allen. It was adapted into an award-winning 1991 animated short film.

Plot
Norvin, a boy who  closely resembles a shark, grows tired of bumping into people while swimming in a nearby beach called Caramel Cove. He makes a dorsal fin out of plastic and masquerades as a shark to scare the other swimmers out of the water. After the people decide to start swimming again, Norvin tries to repeat the tactic, but a female shark confuses him for a real shark and asks to marry him. The shark states that she would lose her temper and bite Norvin if he does not marry her, leading Norvin to swimming away for his life. When Norvin appears on land while shaking, the others realize that he was never a shark. The swimmers put up a net to stop the actual shark from entering Caramel Cove, but Norvin develops aquaphobia and is too scared to enter the water ever again.

Reception
A Publishers Weekly review states, "Mahy's amusing tongue-in-cheek tale meets its match in Allen's droll drawings. Norvin's wonderfully shifty eyes and the vivid expressions on the faces of his victims are certain to tickle funnybones". The picture book was used as an example of irony within children's books in the book Books in the Life of a Child.

The book was adapted into a 1991 animated short film with the same title. The film was nominated for Best Animated Short at the 1992 Chicago International Children's Film Festival. It won Best Children's Animated Production at the Ottawa International Animation Festival, the CINE Golden Eagle Award in 1992, and the Bronze Medal from New York Festivals.

References

1989 children's books
New Zealand children's books
American picture books
Books by Margaret Mahy